Yoheysheh (also Romanized as Yoḩeysheh, Yahīsheh, and Yoḩīsheh) is a village in Gheyzaniyeh Rural District, in the Central District of Ahvaz County, Khuzestan Province, Iran. At the 2006 census, its population was 37, in 5 families.

References 

Populated places in Ahvaz County